Henry Howard Brownell (February 6, 1820 – 1872) was an American poet and historian.

Biography
Brownell was born in Providence, Rhode Island, February 6, 1820. He graduated from Trinity College, Hartford, in 1841, studied law, and was admitted to the bar, but settled as a teacher in Hartford. He published in 1847 a volume of Poems and in 1851 the People's Book of Ancient and Modern History, and followed this in 1863 with The Discoverers, Pioneers, and Settlers of North and South America. But Brownell first attracted general attention with poems written during the Civil War. The earliest of these was a stirring version of the "General Orders" given by Admiral Farragut at the attack on the defenses of New Orleans. This led to his becoming attached to Admiral Farragut as private secretary. He was present at the naval battle in Mobile Bay, and after the war accompanied the Admiral on his European cruise.  His best poems, "The River Fight" and "The Bay Fight" deal with the naval actions at New Orleans and Mobile. He collected his war poems in Lyrics of a day; or, Newspaper Poetry by a Volunteer in the United States Service (1864). A selection of his Poems, revised by himself, appeared in 1866. His was amongst the most popular battle-poetry produced in the North during the Civil War; but his work has been criticized as unfinished, uneven, often undignified, and sometimes grotesque. At its best, however, it sounds the lyric cry of a great national emotion. There is an appreciative essay on Brownell, by Oliver Wendell Holmes, Sr., entitled "Our Battle Laureate."

References

External links
 
 
 

1820 births
1872 deaths
19th-century American poets
American male poets
19th-century American historians
Writers from Providence, Rhode Island
People of Rhode Island in the American Civil War
19th-century American male writers
American male non-fiction writers